This list of tallest buildings in Glasgow includes built and planned high-rise buildings in Glasgow, Scotland. The current tallest structure in Glasgow at 127 metres (417 ft), is the Glasgow Tower within the Glasgow Science Centre, however as this is an observation tower – not strictly speaking a building, then the 26-storey Balgrayhill tower blocks in Springburn area claim the title. The tallest building ever to have stood in Glasgow was the 91.44 m Tait Tower in Bellahouston, built for the Empire Exhibition of 1938, but pulled down the following year.

Faced with crippling housing shortages and overcrowding in the immediate post-war period, the city undertook the building of multi-storey housing in tower blocks in the 1960s and early 1970s on a grand scale, which led to Glasgow becoming the first truly high-rise city in Britain.  However, many of these schemes were poorly planned and cheaply constructed, which led to many of the blocks becoming unsanitary magnets for crime and deprivation.

It would not be until 1988 that high rises were built in the city once again, with the construction of the 17-storey Forum Hotel (latterly the Moat House International Hotel, and now the Crowne Plaza Hotel) next to the SECC. The 20-storey Hilton Hotel in Anderston followed in 1992. From the early 1990s, Glasgow City Council and its successor, the Glasgow Housing Association, have run a programme of demolishing the worst of the residential tower blocks, including Basil Spence's Gorbals blocks in 1993.

Since the late 1990s, property developers have been planning new upmarket residential and office high-rises along the River Clyde, and in the city's financial district, which would far surpass these in height.

Glasgow skyline

The term "tallest building in Glasgow" is itself ambiguous.  Currently, two structures in the city have made a claim for the title depending on which measurement is used:

 Since the demolition in 2015 of both the Red Road Flats and the Bluevale/Whitevale twin towers, the two eastern tower blocks of the 26-storey Balgrayhill high-rise estate in Springburn are the tallest buildings within the Glasgow city boundary.

The tallest building within the city centre is the 17-storey St. Andrew House on Sauchiehall Street, originally an office block but now a Premier Inn hotel.

Tallest buildings in Glasgow

Other notable tall structures
Buildings with a Wikipedia article and over 50 metres in height.

Tallest under construction, approved, and proposed

Approved

Proposed 

Top 10 in Order of Height

Unbuilt

Demolished

See also
Glasgow tower blocks
List of tallest buildings and structures in Edinburgh
List of tallest buildings and structures in Scotland

References

External links
Skyscraper News: Glasgow

Glasgow
 
Tallesst buildings
Tallest buildings in Glasgow